The following is a list of television personalities for NBC Sports Group's telecasts of golf, which are carried by NBC and Golf Channel.

Current announcers

PGA Tour (NBC)
Hosts: Dan Hicks
Analysts: Paul Azinger
Holes: Brad Faxon / Curt Byrum
On Course: John Wood / Smylie Kaufman / Notah Begay
Interviews: Cara Banks / Damon Hack

PGA Tour (Golf Channel)
Hosts: Terry Gannon / Steve Sands / George Savaricas
Analysts: John Cook
Holes: Jim Gallagher / Tripp Isenhour
On Course: Billy Ray Brown / Arron Oberholser / Johnson Wagner

LPGA Tour (Golf Channel / NBC)
Hosts: Grant Boone
Analysts: Morgan Pressel
Holes: Tom Abbott
On Course: Karen Stupples / Kay Cockerill / Paige Mackenzie

Previous announcers

Hosts
 Don Criqui
 Dick Enberg (1995–1999)
 Bill Flemming – While at NBC, Flemming called the U.S. Open golf tournament in 1957.
 Bryant Gumbel (1990)
 Charlie Jones (1991-1992)
 Jim Lampley (1993-1994)
 Bill Mazer
 Jay Randolph
 Vin Scully (1983–1989) – Scully hosted coverage of The Players Championship and The Skins Game in 1989, having called the latter since he first came to NBC in 1983. KYW-TV in Philadelphia notably refused to televise the 1983 event, the inaugural Skins Game and Scully’s first involvement in golf since his time with the PGA Tour on CBS, where he had called The Masters until 1982.
 Jim Simpson

Analysts
 John Brodie (1981–1998)
 Bruce Devlin (1977–1982)
 Gary Hallberg
 Brad Faxon (2010)
 Dave Marr (1995–1997)
 Johnny Miller (1990–2019)
 Bob Murphy (2000–2009)
 Debbie Steinbach
 Bob Toski
 Lee Trevino (1983–1989)
 Bob Trumpy (1990–1996)

Reporters
 Mark McCumber (1991–1994)
 Dan Pohl (1995–1997)
 John Schroeder (1991–1999)
 Ed Sneed (2000–2004)
 Dottie Pepper (2005–2012)

Interviewers
 Bob Costas (U.S. Open, 2003–2013)
 Dan Patrick (The Players Championship, 2009–2012)
 Josh Elliott (The Players Championship, 2014–2015)

References

Commentators
NBC